Buckner Fieldhouse is a 3,500 seat multi-purpose arena in Fort Richardson, Alaska, near Anchorage.

From 1978–1982, it was home to the Great Alaska Shootout basketball tournament. It was replaced as the Shootout venue when the Sullivan Arena opened in 1983.

References

Basketball venues in Alaska
Defunct college basketball venues in the United States
Indoor arenas in Alaska
Sports venues in Anchorage, Alaska
Swimming venues in the United States